Dilute was an indie and math rock band from Fremont, California, active from 2001 to 2004. Its members have been in bands such as Okay, Natural Dreamers, 31knots, and Jacques Kopstein. They have two full-length studio albums, The Gypsy Valentine Curve (2001) and Grape Blueprints Pour Spinach Olive Grape (2002), and a live album with Hella. They had been signed through three record labels, 54 40 or Fight!, Toad Records, and Sickroom Records.

Marty Anderson, housebound due to Crohn's disease, later began the musical project 'Okay'.

Members 
 Marty Anderson - Guitar, Vocals 
 Jay Pellicci - Drums 
 Craig Colla - Bass Guitar 
 Ian Pellicci - Guitar

Album Discography 

 The Gypsy Valentine Curve (54 40 or Fight!) - Released 2001 
 Grape Blueprints Pour Spinach Olive Grape (54 40 or Fight!, Toad Records) - Released 2002 
 Hella + Dilute live split (Sickroom Records), with Hella - Released 2004

References

Math rock
Musical groups from California